Harold Brent Wallis (born Aaron Blum Wolowicz; October 19, 1898 – October 5, 1986) was an American film producer. He is best known for producing Casablanca (1942), The Adventures of Robin Hood (1938), and True Grit (1969), along with many other major films for Warner Bros. featuring such film stars as Humphrey Bogart, John Wayne, Bette Davis, and Errol Flynn. As a producer, he received 19 nominations for the Academy Award for Best Picture.

Later on, for a long period, he was connected with Paramount Pictures and oversaw films featuring  Dean Martin, Jerry Lewis, Elvis Presley, and John Wayne.

Life and career
Aaron Blum Wolowicz was born October 19, 1898 in Chicago, Illinois, the son of Eva (née Ewa Blum) and Jacob Wolowicz/Wolovitz (Jankiel Wołowicz). He was the youngest of three children and had two older sisters: Minna Wolovitz (1893-1986), a Hollywood talent agent, and Juel Wolovitz (1895-1953). His parents were Ashkenazi Jews from the Suwałki region of Congress Poland, which was then part of the Russian Empire and is now Poland. The future producer and his sisters eventually changed their surname to Wallis.

His family moved in 1922 to Los Angeles, California, where he found work as part of the publicity department at Warner Bros. in 1923. Within a few years, Wallis became involved in the production end of the business and would eventually become head of production at Warner. In a career that spanned more than 50 years, he was involved with the production of more than 400 feature-length movies.

Among the more significant movies he produced were Casablanca, Dark Victory, The Adventures of Robin Hood, The Maltese Falcon, Sergeant York, and Now, Voyager.

In March 1944, Wallis won the Academy Award for Best Picture at the 16th Academy Awards. During the  ceremony, when the award was announced for Casablanca, Wallis got up to accept, but studio head Jack L. Warner rushed up to the stage "with a broad, flashing smile and a look of great self-satisfaction," Wallis later recalled. "I couldn't believe it was happening. Casablanca had been my creation; Jack had absolutely nothing to do with it. As the audience gasped, I tried to get out of the row of seats and into the aisle, but the entire Warner family sat blocking me. I had no alternative but to sit down again, humiliated and furious ... Almost forty years later, I still haven't recovered from the shock."  This incident would lead Wallis to leave Warner Bros. the next month.

Wallis started to work as an independent producer, enjoying considerable success both commercially and critically. The first screenwriters he hired for his new enterprise were Ayn Rand and Lillian Hellman. Among his financial hits were the Dean Martin and Jerry Lewis comedies, and several of Elvis Presley's movies.

He produced True Grit, for which John Wayne won the Academy Award for Best Actor of 1969, and its sequel.

After moving to Universal Pictures, he produced Anne of the Thousand Days (starring Richard Burton and Canadian actress Geneviève Bujold) and Mary, Queen of Scots (starring Vanessa Redgrave and Glenda Jackson). He received 16 Academy Award producer nominations for Best Picture, winning for Casablanca in 1943.

For his consistently high quality of motion picture production, he was twice honored with the Academy Awards' Irving G. Thalberg Memorial Award. He was also nominated for seven Golden Globe awards, twice winning awards for Best Picture. In 1975, he received the Golden Globe Cecil B. DeMille Award for lifetime achievement in motion pictures.

In 1980, he published his autobiography, Starmaker, co-written with Charles Higham.

In the 1930s, Wallis invested in residential real estate development in Sherman Oaks, California. He named Halbrent Avenue after himself, using his nickname "Hal" and his middle name "Brent". Most of its original homes still stand, and it is very close to Ventura and Sepulveda Boulevards and the Sherman Oaks Galleria used extensively in the 1982 movie Fast Times at Ridgemont High.

Wallis and his second wife, actress Martha Hyer, contributed funds towards the construction of The Hal and Martha Hyer Wallis Theatre, a black box theater, at Northwestern University.

Marriages
Wallis was married to actress Louise Fazenda from 1927 until her death in 1962. They had one son, Brent, who became a psychiatrist. Wallis was married to actress Martha Hyer from 1966 until his death in 1986.

Politics
Wallis was a lifelong Republican, who supported Dwight D. Eisenhower in the 1952 US Presidential Election. He was also a member of the Motion Picture Alliance for the Preservation of American Ideals.

Death
Wallis died on October 5, 1986, of complications of diabetes in Rancho Mirage, California, two weeks away from his 88th birthday. News of his passing was not released until after his private memorial service was completed. U.S. President Ronald W. Reagan, who appeared in Wallis's films Santa Fe Trail and This Is The Army, sent his condolences to the family. Wallis is interred at the Great Mausoleum at Forest Lawn Memorial Park Cemetery in Glendale, California.

Filmography
 Moby Dick (1930, co-producer and first work)
 Little Caesar (1931)
 Central Airport (1933)
 The Petrified Forest (1936)
 Kid Galahad (1937)
 West of Shanghai (1937)
 The Invisible Menace (1938)
 The Adventures of Robin Hood (1938)
 Comet Over Broadway (1938)
 Dark Victory (1939)
 The Private Lives of Elizabeth and Essex (1939)
 All This, and Heaven Too (1940)
 Castle on the Hudson (1940)
 Santa Fe Trail (1940)
 Sergeant York (1941)
 The Maltese Falcon (1941)
 They Died with Their Boots On (1941)
 Casablanca (1942)
 Now, Voyager (1942)
 Yankee Doodle Dandy (1942)
 This Is the Army (1943)
 Love Letters (1945)
 You Came Along (1945)
 The Strange Love of Martha Ivers (1946)
 Desert Fury (1947)
 I Walk Alone (1947)
 So Evil My Love (1948)
 Sorry, Wrong Number (1948)
 The Accused (1949)
 Rope of Sand (1949)
 Paid in Full (1950)
 September Affair (1950)
 Dark City (1950)
 The Furies (1950)
About Mrs. Leslie (1954)
 The Rainmaker (1956)
 Gunfight at the O.K. Corral (1957)
 Loving You (1957)
 King Creole (1958)
 Career (1959)
 G.I. Blues (1960)
 Visit to a Small Planet (1960)
 Blue Hawaii (1961)
 Summer and Smoke (1961)
 Girls! Girls! Girls! (1962)
 Fun in Acapulco (1963)
 Wives and Lovers (1963)
 Becket (1964)
 Roustabout (1964)
 The Sons of Katie Elder (1965)
 Paradise, Hawaiian Style (1966)
 Barefoot in the Park (1967)
 Easy Come, Easy Go (1967)
 True Grit (1969)
 Anne of the Thousand Days (1969)
 Mary, Queen of Scots (1971)
 Rooster Cogburn (1975)

Academy Awards

1938 and 1943 Irving G. Thalberg Memorial Awards

References

External links
 
 
 Literature on Hal B. Wallis
 Hal Wallis papers, Margaret Herrick Library, Academy of Motion Picture Arts and Sciences

1898 births
1986 deaths
American film producers
Film producers from California
American film studio executives
Warner Bros. people
Cecil B. DeMille Award Golden Globe winners
Businesspeople from Chicago
People from Rancho Mirage, California
People from Greater Los Angeles
Producers who won the Best Picture Academy Award
American people of Polish-Jewish descent
Deaths from diabetes
Burials at Forest Lawn Memorial Park (Glendale)
Golden Globe Award-winning producers
Film producers from Illinois
20th-century American businesspeople